Lisa Darmanin (born 27 August 1991) is an Australian competitive sailor.

She won the Silver medal  in the mixed Nacra 17 at the 2016 Summer Olympics in Rio de Janeiro.

In March 2020, Darmanin and fellow crew member Jason Waterhouse were selected to represent Australia for sailing at the 2020 Summer Olympics in Tokyo, where they placed fifth.

Darmanin was recognized by Australian Sailing as Australian Female Sailor of the Year in 2015, 2016, 2020, and 2021.

References

External links
 

1991 births
Living people
Australian female sailors (sport)
Olympic sailors of Australia
Sailors at the 2016 Summer Olympics – Nacra 17
Olympic silver medalists for Australia
Olympic medalists in sailing
Medalists at the 2016 Summer Olympics
Sailors at the 2020 Summer Olympics – Nacra 17
21st-century Australian women